Local mayoral by-elections were held in the Kosovo  municipalities of Leposavić, North Mitrovica, Zubin Potok, and Zvečan on 17 October 2019.

All four municipalities are predominantly Kosovo Serb communities in the northern part of Kosovo, on the border with Central Serbia. The incumbents mayors of each community had resigned in November 2018 in protest against the Government of Kosovo's imposition of a one hundred per cent tax on goods from Serbia. Both the Government of Serbia and the Serb List called for a high turnout from the Serb community.

Results
The outcome of the elections was never in doubt, and the Serb List won without difficulty in all four communities.

Leposavić

North Mitrovica

Zubin Potok

Zvečan

Notes

References

Local elections in Kosovo
L
L